Saffron Dynamo Football Club is a football club based in Cosby, Leicestershire, England.

History
The club was founded in 1963 by a group of friends playing friendly matches on Saffron Lane Recreation Field (hence the name). One of the original men was Bob King who is still with the club to this day and is now the treasurer/secretary.

In 1976 the club moved to Cambridge road where they initially rented a pitch from Wellington Vics. With the demise of the Vics in 1984 the ground was purchased by SDFC.

In 1994 SDFC joined the Leicestershire Senior League and over time had steadily built up its youth teams, now operating al the way from U5's to U15's.

In 2011 the club secured funding to build a new clubhouse.

More recently a 3G has been installed and the first team secured promotion to the United Counties League having finished runners up in the Leicestershire Senior League in the 2018/19 season.

Ground 
Since 1976 the club play their home games at King's Park, Cambridge Road, Cosby. After 8 years the club purchased the ground. In 2011 the club opened their new clubhouse and changing facilities.

Honours

'''Leicestershire Senior League Beacon Bitter Trophy 
Winners (2) 1999-00, 2006–07

Management
 President - JB James
 Chairman - Nick Evans
 Treasurer - Bob King
 Secretary - Dylan Clarke
 Welfare officer - Lisa Smith
 Director of kit - Mark Jenkins
 (TWAT) Team Welfare And Towels - Mark Jenkins
 Head Groundsman - Jason Smith
 Head director of the gate - William Simmons
 Social Media Manager - James Simmons
 Senior Section Secretary - James Simmons
 1st Team Manager - 
 1st Team Coaches - Steve Anastasi and Charlie Paterson
 1st Team Physio - Jack Faulkner

Records
Best FA Vase performance: Second round, 2018–19

References

Football clubs in England
Football clubs in Leicestershire
1963 establishments in England
Association football clubs established in 1963
Leicestershire Senior League
United Counties League